Rails West! is a 1984 video game published by Strategic Simulations.

Gameplay
Rails West! is a game in which railroads in the period of 1870 to 1900 are the focus of an economic simulation.

Reception
Bob Proctor reviewed the game for Computer Gaming World, and stated that "Rails West has the high-quality components one expects from SSI. It is lots of fun when all of the players are humans, even if they're inexperienced. It would make an excellent classroom exercise in the hands of a competent teacher."

Reviews
Computer Gaming World - Oct, 1990

References

External links
Review in Softalk
Review in Antic
Review in Family Computing
Review in Page 6
Review in Electronic Games
Review in MicroTimes
Review in GAMES magazine

1984 video games
Apple II games
Atari 8-bit family games
Commodore 64 games
Railroad business simulation video games
Strategic Simulations games
Video games developed in the United States
Video games set in the 19th century
Video games set in the United States